The Hines' Raid was a Confederate exploratory mission led by Thomas Hines, on orders from John Hunt Morgan, into the state of Indiana in June 1863 during the American Civil War.  Hines' mission was to prepare the groundwork of Morgan's Raid across the Ohio River into Indiana and Ohio by seeing what support the local Knights of the Golden Circle and Copperheads would provide for the main operation.

Mission
The mission began in Woodbury, Tennessee, on June 10, 1863, where Morgan had a picket camp.  At the start of the mission, Hines only told his men that their mission would be "long and dangerous" and allowed any man who did not wish to go to step out; none did.  From there, they traveled through Brownsville, Kentucky, and Elizabethtown, Kentucky.  At Brownsville, they stole clothing from a Union sutler, consisting of shirts, trousers, and boots of Union uniforms.  At Elizabethtown, the group robbed a train, providing Hines' force with Union currency.  When they reached the Ohio River, Hines' then informed his men that they would pose as Union troops under General Jeremiah T. Boyle with orders to pursue deserters, called the Indiana Grays.  The crossing occurred between Alton, Indiana, and Tobinsport, Indiana, on June 18, 1863, presumably near Derby, Indiana.

Once he crossed the Ohio River, Hines' men rode straight to Paoli, Indiana, successfully posing as Union soldiers.  While being served dinner in Paoli, actual Indiana Home Guards entered the town, and informed the mayor of the deception.  The Confederates escaped by convincing a separate band of Home Guards that they were surrounded, taking the best horses the actual Union troops had, and saying the captured Union band was paroled.  They then went to French Lick, Indiana where Hines met the local Copperhead leader Doctor William A. Bowles, whose home was a gathering place for the Democratic Party.  Bowles told Hines he could raise a force of 10,000, but before the deal was finalized, Hines was told a Union force was approaching, causing him to flee.  As a result, there would be no support for Morgan's Raid by them.

From French Lick, Hines' men traveled to Valeene, Indiana.  At Valeene, while still posing as Union troops, they set a house on fire whose occupants refused to give them dinner.  This exposed that Hines' men were actually Confederates to the local populace.  A resistance was quickly formed at Paoli.  Hines had hired a local man, Bryant Breeden, to guide them to safety, but Breeden was strongly pro-Union, and instead guided the Confederates onto the Little Blue Island, a small island in the middle of the Ohio River near Leavenworth, Indiana.  On this island, a skirmish began, killing three Confederate soldiers.  Hines escaped across the Ohio River with a few of his men, and the rest of the Confederate force surrendered, having successfully covered Hines' escape.  The Corydon Weekly Democrat said of the Home Guards "Our citizens, though unused to actual war, showed the nerve of soldiers".

Aftermath
Thomas Hines traveled throughout Kentucky by railroad until it was time to rejoin Morgan, which he did at Brandenburg, Kentucky, being put immediately in command of Morgan's artillery.  Hines had to inform Morgan that they would receive no help from Hoosier Confederate sympathizers, which many believe made Morgan decide to deal more harshly with any Hoosier citizen who would later claim to be sympathetic to the Confederate cause. In Morgan's subsequent raid, on July 9, 1863 after capturing Corydon he exacted tribute from the citizens, in part because of the treatment of Hines earlier that year.  Lew Wallace would say that it was his actions that discouraged any Hoosiers from helping Hines and Morgan.

Hines' immediate superior and Morgan's second in command, Basil W. Duke, had not been informed of Hines' mission previously.  When Hines finally saw what he saw as his prodigal son, Duke remarked how Hines was resting next to a wharfboat "apparently the most listless inoffensive youth that was ever imposed upon".

Most of the area Thomas Hines traveled in this raid is within present-day Hoosier National Forest.

Notes

References
Crenshaw, C. Bedford.  Galloping Up the Glen (Indiana University Southeast, 2002) pg. 26-29.

See also

List of battles fought in Indiana

Crawford County, Indiana
Orange County, Indiana
Cavalry raids of the American Civil War
1863 in Indiana
Military operations of the American Civil War in Indiana
June 1863 events